Rohtak Assembly constituency is one of the 90 assembly constituencies of Haryana a northern state of India.  Rohtak is also part of Rohtak Lok Sabha constituency.

Members of the Legislative Assembly

See also

 Rohtak
 List of constituencies of the Haryana Legislative Assembly

References

Assembly constituencies of Haryana
Rohtak
Rohtak district